Vincenzo Migliaro (1858–1938) was an Italian painter born in Naples.

Biography
After learning the art of wood carving at courses held by the Società Centrale Operaia Napoletana and working in the studio of Stanislao Lista, Migliaro enrolled in 1875 at the Naples Institute of Fine Arts, where his masters included Domenico Morelli. While a short trip to Paris in 1877 afforded him the opportunity to study the works exhibited in the Louvre, the artist's main source of inspiration was Naples and its highly animated everyday life. The works he presented in exhibitions at the national and international level – including Turin (1880, 1884, and 1898) and Barcelona (1911), where he won a silver medal – gained him a reputation as a keen observer of Neapolitan life. Involved in the decoration of the Caffè Gambrinus in the following decade together with Vincenzo Irolli and other painters, he took part in the Venice Biennale from 1901 to 1928 and exhibited alongside Vincenzo Caprile and Vincenzo Gemito, both Neapolitans, at the Galleria Pesaro, Milan, in 1927.

References
 Laura Casone, Vincenzo Migliaro, online catalogue Artgate by Fondazione Cariplo, 2010, CC BY-SA (source for the first revision of this article).

Other projects
 Portrait of Migliaro by Gaetano Esposito

19th-century Italian painters
Italian male painters
20th-century Italian painters
Painters from Naples
Accademia di Belle Arti di Napoli alumni
1858 births
1938 deaths
19th-century Italian male artists
20th-century Italian male artists